The Boyle River is a river of New Zealand. A tributary of the Hope River, it flows south, then west before curving round to the southeast and then joining with the Hope. State Highway 7 follows the course of the river for some distance south of the Lewis Pass; the pass itself is located less than five kilometres to the west of the river's source. The upper reaches of the river form a deep valley between the Opera Range and the Libretto Range.

See also
List of rivers of New Zealand

References
Land Information New Zealand - Search for Place Names

Rivers of Canterbury, New Zealand
Rivers of New Zealand